The 1918–19 Irish Cup was the 39th edition of the premier knock-out cup competition in Irish football. 

Linfield won the tournament for the 13th time, defeating Glentoran 2–1 in the second final replay after the previous two matches had ended in draws.

Results

First round

|}

Replay

|}

Quarter-finals

|}

Semi-finals

|}

Final

Replay

Second replay

References

External links
 Northern Ireland Cup Finals. Rec.Sport.Soccer Statistics Foundation (RSSSF)

Irish Cup seasons
1918–19 domestic association football cups
1918–19 in Irish association football